The ACT Academy of Sport (ACTAS) was launched in 1989. It is an endorsed Australian Olympic Committee and Australian Paralympic Committee National Training Centre and a member of the National Institutes of Network.

History
The establishment of ACTAS as a pilot program was announced in the Australian Government's budget delivered in August 1988. ACTAS was allocated a budget of $100,000 as part the Community Development Fund. At the time of the announcement, the Australian Government was responsible for sport development in the Australian Capital Territory. The ACT Government took over responsibility after self government in 1989. ACTAS first Chairman was Dick Telford, head of Australian Institute of Sport Sports Science. ACTAS first executive officer was Jenny Roberts 
and it was located at the Canberra College of Advanced Education's Centre of Sports Studies. In 1994, it became a partner of the Australian Sports Commission's  Olympic Athlete Program, which provided $350,000 to employ eight full-time coaches. In January 1995, there were 11 full and part-time administrators and 10 full-time coaches and a budget of $1 million. In 1995 Ken Norris replaced Jenny Roberts as chief executive officer and ACTAS moved to Bruce Stadium. In 1999, ACTAS was recognized by the Australian Olympic Committee as an Olympic Training Centre. In 2015, ACTAS new training facility was opened  as part of upgrade the National Hockey Centre.

The purpose 

ACTAS aim is to assist Canberra's elite, and potentially elite athletes and teams improve their sporting performances.  It provides a range of athlete performance services - coaching, training, sport science, athlete welfare and development and competition assistance.

Sports
In 2016, ACTAS offers has six sports scholarship programs: basketball, cycling, hockey, football, netball and rowing.
It also offers scholarships to individual athletes. In the past these scholarships have been offered to athletes in a range of sports including: athletics, triathlon, judo, boxing, wrestling, swimming, orienteering, squash, table tennis, power-lifting, equestrian and volleyball.

Notable athletes
Since its launch in 1989, ACTAS has developed numerous Olympic, Paralympic and Commonwealth Games representatives. 
Athletics 

Olympics: Susan Hobson, Matt Beckenham, Zoe Buckman,  Lisa Corrigan, Stuart Rendell, Brendan Cole, Melissa Breen, Lauren Wells 
Paralympics: Angie Ballard, Andrew Laggner, Lisa Llorens, Richard Nicholson, Sharon Rackham, Murray Goldfinch, Roy Daniell, Louise Ellery  
Commonwealth Games: Susan Hobson, Matt Beckenham, Lisa Corrigan, Brendan Cole, Stuart Rendell, Melissa Breen, Lauren Wells 
Baseball 
Olympics: Jeff Williams 
Basketball  

Olympics: Patrick Mills 
Paralympics: Tristan Knowles 
Boxing 
Olympics: Gerard O'Mahony 
Commonwealth Games:Gerard O'Mahony, Steven Rudic 
Cricket 
Australian team: Michael Bevan 
Cycling 

Olympics: Michael Rogers Oenone Wood, Caroline Buchanan,  Gracie Elvin, Michael Matthews, Tracey Gaudry, Mary Grigson, Chloe Hosking,  Dan Ellis, Rebecca Henderson  
Paralympics: Michael Milton, Jane Armstrong, Anthony Biddle, Kial Stewart, Sue Powell 
Commonwealth Games: Michael Rogers, Margaret Hemsley, Mary Grigson, Alison Wright, Mathew Hayman, Oenone Wood, Dan Ellis, Chloe Hosking, Gracie Elvin, Nathan Haas, Vicki Whitelaw, Michael Matthews, Nathan Hart, Brandie O'Connor, Thomas Clarke (pilot), Paul Kennedy 
Others:  Peter Rogers, Deane Rogers,  Rebecca Wiasak   
Football 
Olympics: Peita-Claire Hepperlin, Amy Wilson, Sacha Wainwright, Nikolai Topor-Stanley, Lydia Williams  
Other: Julie Murray,  George Timotheou 
 Hockey 
Olympics: Anna Flanagan, Glenn Turner, Nicole Arrold, Michael York, Lisa Carruthers, Katrina Powell , Andrew Charter 
Commonwealth Games: Michael York, Lisa Carruthers, Katrina Powell, Ben Taylor, Sarah Taylor, Nicole Arrold, Glenn Turner, Anna Flanagan, Edwina Bone, Andrew Charter 
Ice Skating 
World Championships: Miriam Manzano 
Judo 
Olympics: Matt D'Aquino, Tom Hill
Lawn Bowls 
Commonwealth Games: Adam Jeffrey 
Rowing 

Olympics: Sarah Cook, Sonia Mills, Kay Hick, Bruce Hick, Kerry Knowler, Jamie Fernandez, Nick Porzig, Brett Hayman, Craig Jones, Jane Robinson 
Commonwealth Games: Kay Hick, Jamie Fernandez, Bruce Hick, Nick Portzig, Fleur Spriggs, Craig Jones, Mitchell Punch 
Sailing  
Olympics: Brendan Todd  
Paralympics: Peter Thompson 
Skiing 
Olympics: Laura Peel 
Paralympics: Michael Milton 
Shooting 
Olympics: Matthew Inabinet  
Softball 
Olympics: Joanne Brown, Sally McCreedy  
Squash 
Commonwealth Games: Stuart Boswell 
Swimming 
Olympics: Angela Kennedy 
Paralympics: Siobhan Paton, Katrina Lewis, Joshua Alford 
Table tennis 
Olympics: Jeff Plumb, Alison Shanley 
Triathlon 
Olympics: Simon Thompson 
Paralympics: Katie Kelly, Nic Beveridge 
Volleyball 
Olympics: Ben Hardy 
Wheelchair Rugby 
Paralympics: Garry Croker

References

External links
ACT Academy of Sport website
Unveiling of ACTAS Wall of Fame

Sport in the Australian Capital Territory
Australian Institute of Sport